Peter Mandler,  (born 1958) is a British historian and academic specialising in 19th and 20th century British history, particularly cultural history and the history of the social sciences. He is Professor in Modern Cultural History at the University of Cambridge and Bailey fellow in History at Gonville and Caius College, Cambridge.

Biography
Mandler was born in 1958 in the United States of America. After attending Magdalen College, Oxford, as an undergraduate, Mandler did his PhD at Harvard where he wrote a dissertation entitled Liberalism and Paternalism: The Whig Aristocracy and the Condition of England, 1830–1852.

Mandler started teaching in Britain in 1991 at London Guildhall University, and joined the  University of Cambridge faculty in 2001. He was President of the Royal Historical Society from 2012 to 2016, and is currently (since 2018) Chair of the Modern History section of the British Academy.

Research and scholarship
Mandler's main research interests are:
British history since c. 1800, especially cultural, intellectual and social history;
the history of the humanities and social sciences in Britain and America;
concepts and methods in cultural history;
educational history and policy.

In his review of Mandler's 2002 book History and National Life, historian Blair Worden states that Mandler praises the work of professional historians like Simon Schama, Linda Colley and Niall Ferguson, who address a wide audience, in contrast to most specialists of the discipline, who put their very subject at risk by speaking only between themselves. In Mandler' own words, "there is intrinsic value in keeping the springs of knowledge 'clear and untainted' but there is greater value in ensuring that the supply reaches the consumer in something resembling its original state".

Mandler occasionally makes television and radio appearances.

Works
Mandler's is author or editor of the following books:

Great Philanthropists: Wealth and Charity in the Modern World, 1815-1945 (ed., with David Cesarani) (Vallentine Mitchell, 2017).
Return from the Natives: How Margaret Mead won the Second World War and lost the Cold War (Yale University Press, 2013).
From Plunder to Preservation: Britain and the Heritage of Empire, c.1800-1940 (ed., with Astrid Swenson) (British Academy, 2013).
The English National Character: The History of an Idea from Edmund Burke to Tony Blair (Yale University Press, 2006). Review in The Guardian. Review in The New York Sun.
Liberty and Authority in Victorian Britain (ed.) (Oxford University Press, 2006)
History and National Life (Profile Books, 2002). Review in Reviews in History (Institute of Historical Research).
The Fall and Rise of the Stately Home (Yale University Press, 1997).
After the Victorians: Private Conscience and Public Duty in Modern Britain: Essays in memory of John Clive (ed., with Susan Pedersen) (Routledge, 1994).
The Uses of Charity: The Poor on Relief in the 19th-Century Metropolis (ed.) (University of Pennsylvania Press, 1990).
Aristocratic Government in the Age of Reform: Whigs and Liberals, 1830-1852 (Clarendon Press, 1990).

References

Presidents of the Royal Historical Society
Alumni of Magdalen College, Oxford
Harvard University alumni
Members of the University of Cambridge faculty of history
Living people
1958 births
Fellows of the British Academy
Fellows of Gonville and Caius College, Cambridge
Fellows of the Royal Historical Society